The Attack is the 26th book in the Animorphs series, written by K.A. Applegate. It has the distinction of being the last book in the main series written by Applegate herself with the exception of #32: The Separation, #53: The Answer, #54: The Beginning. It is narrated by a character named Jake.

Plot summary
When the Animorphs attend a performance of The Lion King at a school assembly, the Ellimist freezes time and appears to enlist their aid. He tells them there is another force as powerful as him: Crayak. The Ellimist reveals that this creature is the blood-red eye Jake saw when the yeerk in his head died in the sixth book, The Capture.

The Ellimist explains that when Crayak first appeared, the two of them waged a war which destroyed a tenth of the galaxy. Realizing that their fight needed to be more subtle, the two fight now indirectly.

Crayak is targeting another race, called the Iskoort, and that interferes with the Ellimist's concealed agenda. The fate of the Iskoort will be determined through a proxy battle with rules of engagement. Crayak and the Ellimist will each choose seven combatants to face off on the Iskoort home world. Crayak has chosen seven of his shock troops, the Howlers, members of the race which destroyed the Pemalites.

The Animorphs choose Pemalite, Erek King as their seventh, and they are taken to the Iskoort world, huge metropolis miles above the ground. While the Iskoort turn out to be bizarre and grating, they are not actually evil. The Animorphs and Erek enlist a young Iskoort trader named Guide to show them around.

Eventually, they run into one of the Howlers. They barely survive the fight, while the Howler quickly recovers from its injuries. Regrouping, they buy copies of Howler's memories with Guide's assistance. Erek watches the purchased Howler memories, revealing all the massacres the Howlers have committed, including that of his own people. They determine that the Howlers were created by Crayak, and that they have collective memories, giving them each thousands of years of battle experience. There are no memories of the Howlers ever being defeated.

The Animorphs find a new safehouse as Guide mentions a personal errand: A function of Iskoort physiology requires the Iskoort to separate into two halves, the Isk, the body, and a slug-like entity, the Yoort which must feed every three days. The similarity to Yeerks is upsetting to the group, but Guide explains that while the early Yoort were similar to the Yeerks, they disliked their evolved biology of parasitism. Unlike the Yeerks, the Isk employed genetic engineering to create a primary host, the Isk, and additionally altered Yoort physiology to become true symbiotes in order to maintain the established standard of living but removing the need for violence. At this point, the relevance of the Iskoort to both the Ellimist and the Crayak is revealed: should the Yeerks ever interact with the Iskoort, the Yeerks would learn of the possibility for nonviolent existence.

After several narrow escapes, Jake and a Howler both fall off of a building towards the ground below. Jake acquires the Howler and quickly morphs to peregrine falcon, pulling to safety as the Howler plummets to its death. Once safe, Jake reunites with the others. Jake and Cassie run to each other and kiss.

Upon morphing into a Howler under the supervision of his teammates, Jake discovers that the Howlers are not evil, but childlike creatures who believe their battles to be games. The group deduces that the fact that the Howlers have never lost means that Crayak must intervene whenever they are in danger of losing.

The Animorphs, along with Erek and Guide make their own memory recordings. When the Howlers next attack, the Animorphs use Jake in Howler morph to stun one of them and force the combined memories of the eight of them into the Howlers along with the knowledge that the non-Howlers are real beings. Crayak is forced to destroy all six Howlers before the memories can contaminate the collective memory. This is successful except for the memory of Jake and Cassie's kiss.

The Ellimist transports the Animorphs to n-dimensional space in order to talk with Crayak face-to-face in a way that the Animorphs can see. Crayak concedes defeat and agrees that the Iskoort will live.

Upon returning them to earth the Elilimist reveals that in a few months' time, on the next Howler raid, the Howlers will attempt to kiss their targets. The Ellimist also reveals that in three hundred years' time, the Iskoort will meet the Yeerks.

Morphs

References

Animorphs books
1999 American novels
1999 science fiction novels
Novels set on fictional planets
Novels about genetic engineering
Fiction about interracial romance
Fiction about death games
Hive minds in fiction